Eardington is a civil parish in Shropshire, England.  It contains 14 listed buildings that are recorded in the National Heritage List for England.  Of these, two are at Grade II*, the middle of the three grades, and the others are at Grade II, the lowest grade.  The parish contains the village of Eardington and the surrounding countryside.  The listed buildings consist of houses, farmhouses, a public house, a bridge, and a mill and mill house.


Key

Buildings

References

Citations

Sources

Lists of buildings and structures in Shropshire